David Marrero and Rubén Ramírez Hidalgo won the first edition of this tournament, defeating Daniel Gimeno-Traver and Morgan Phillips, 6–4, 6–7(8–10), [11–9] in the final.

Seeds

Draw

Draw

References
 Main Draw

Doubles